NGC 1980 (also known as OCL 529, Collinder 72 and The Lost Jewel of Orion) is a young open cluster associated with an emission nebula in the constellation Orion. It was discovered by William Herschel on 31 January 1786. Its apparent size is 14 × 14 arc minutes and it is located around the star Iota Orionis on the southern tip of the Orion constellation.

Herschel made his first observation of the cluster which was called WH V 31 on 31 January 1786, but he possibly observed it during his studies of double stars on 20 September 1783.

References

Open clusters
Orion molecular cloud complex
1980
Orion (constellation)
Astronomical objects discovered in 1783
Discoveries by William Herschel

Orion–Cygnus Arm